T-Street is an American film and television production company led by Rian Johnson and Ram Bergman. Under its T-Street Productions division, the company is responsible for the feature-length film Knives Out and the sequel Glass Onion.

History

In September 2019, Rian Johnson and producer Ram Bergman launched T-Street, an entrepreneurial company that will generate original content for film and TV shows. The venture is fully capitalized by global media company Valence Media. T-Street launched with a first look deal with Valence Media's Media Rights Capital for film and television projects. Valence Media holds a substantial minority equity stake in the company. Johnson and Bergman intend to make their own original creations through the company, and produce others.

On October 25, 2019, Nena Rodrigue was named President of Television for T-Street. Rodrigue will have creative oversight of all television projects for the studio. She most recently served as EVP of Programming and Production for BBC America, overseeing original scripted programming at the network following its acquisition by AMC Networks.

On November 14, 2019 it was announced Kiri Hart, Stephen Feder and Ben LeClair had been named producers at T-Street. Hart most recently served as Lucasfilm's Senior Vice President of Development from 2012 to 2018. Feder most recently served as Vice President of Film Development at Lucasfilm, reporting to Hart. LeClair most recently had a first-look deal with Blumhouse Television, and in 2018 was nominated by Film Independent for the Piaget Producers Award. Leopold Hughes and Nikos Karamigios were also named producers at T-Street.

Productions

Films

Television series

Awards and recognition
Nominations
 2020 Golden Globe Award Nomination, Best Motion Picture – Musical or Comedy (Knives Out)

References

External links
 T-Street on Internet Movie Database

Film production companies of the United States
Television production companies of the United States
Companies based in Los Angeles
Mass media companies established in 2019